Raffaele Marcellino (born 1964) is an Australian composer.

Biography 

Raffaele Marcellino graduated from the Sydney Conservatorium of Music with merit in 1985.

In 1995 Marcellino joined the staff of the Tasmanian Conservatorium of Music where he served as director from 1996 to 1998 and resumed teaching duties in 1999. In 1999 Arts Tasmania funded the Mountain Orchestra Project, a community arts project with Marcellino was composer and music director and Strato Anagnostis, instrument maker and performer. The Mountain Orchestra was made up of community members who constructed instruments from found objects and other materials and then performed newly composed in a concert on Mt Wellington in Hobart. During his time in Tasmania also served on the Board of the Inaugural 10 Days on the Island Festival and Zootango.

At the end of 2001 he left the University of Tasmania and returned to Sydney to pursue a freelance career and sessional teaching at the Sydney Conservatorium of Music.
In 2003 Marcellino was Composer-in-Residence with eminent Australian vocal ensemble The Song Company directed by Roland Peelman, who had previously commissioned several works. This residency culminated in the choral cycle The O Antiphons and was released on CD, widely performed and broadcast. Other collaborations with the Song Company resulted in Via Dolorosa (1994), a collaborative work with artist Mark Titmarsh performed at the Sydney's Museum of Contemporary Art with other artist-composer collaborations; FishTale (1995), concert work for voices; Sprung! (2000), for Musica Viva Schools performances; and Mrs Macquarie's Cello (2004), for broadcast on ABC Radio and live performance with texts from Donna Abela and Lisa Morrisett.

From 2003 until 2009 Marcellino was the Principal of the Australian Institute of Music in Sydney. In 2010 he became Foundation Dean of the Australian College of the Arts Collarts in Melbourne. After establishing Collarts as a degree-granting institution he was appointed Dean of Macleay College in Sydney in 2011. In 2013 he was appointed Director of Academic and Student Services for SAE Australia. In 2015 Raffaele was appointed Chief Academic Officer for SAE Global based in Oxford, United Kingdom. In 2017 Raffaele returned to Sydney to take up the role of Provost for the Navitas Careers and Industry Division.
Recent creative collaborations have included prominent Australian artists including Greg White (composer), Robert Jarman (actor and theatre-maker), Anna Messariti (producer and theatre maker), The Song Company, Sirens Ensemble, Tom O'Kelly (percussionist), Michael Bates (filmmaker) and Jordie Albiston (poet).

Among his early public performances are Incunabula (1985) performed by the Sydney Symphony Orchestra conducted by Patrick Thomas and Masquerade commissioned and premiered by the Windbags Wind Quintet (1986) led by Sue Newsome. Antipodes (1987), an orchestral work inspired by David Malouf's collection of short stories, was performed by the Tasmanian Symphony Orchestra conducted by Dobbs Franks.

Raffaele collaborated with the Seymour Group, one of Australia's finest new music ensembles with music directors Anthony Fogg, then Mark Summerbell. The result of these collaborations were the ensemble works Whispers of Fauvel (1988), The Lottery in Babylon (1995) and Maze 1998. In 2000 Raffaele partnered with Greg White and the Seymour Group to create Sonic Bach (2000) for ABC Classic FM's The Listening Room produced by Andrew McLennan. Sonic Bach was produced for radio broadcast and also performed as a live show at the New Theatre (Newtown, NSW) and the Performance Space (when it was located at Cleveland St Redfern).

Marcellino's music has been published by Reed Music, Currency Press, Opus House Press, Red House Editions, Grevillea Press and ABC Classics/Universal Music.

Selected works 

Chamber ensemble and solo works
The Lottery in Babylon - performed by The Seymour Group
Zerfliesse mein Herze – performed by Ian Munro, Christian Wojtowicz, Tom O'Kelly and David Malone and featured in A Fork in the Road episode featuring Tasmania
Q – performed by David Malone at the Darwin International Guitar Festival
The Dædalus Sequences – cycle for solo piano, performed by Ian Munro in Newcastle-upon-Tyne.
The Pluperfect Square Dances – performed by Tom O'Kelly in Kunazawa, Japan.
The Art of Perception – performed by the Australia Ensemble at the International Music and Psychology Conference, Sydney
Clarion Call, – a site specific work for the Queensland Conservatorium Griffith University.
Prelude and Blues performed by Rachel Scott cello and Anthony Schulz accordion as part of Bach in the Dark series.

Choral and vocal
O Antiphons performed and recorded by the Song Company and directed by Roland Peelman
Responsorio – for SATB choir; premiered in Sydney by The Contemporary Singers in 1988 , also performed by the Sydney Chamber Choir.
FishTale – for chamber choir, performed by The Song Company.
Logos – for choir and digital delay, performed by Sydney Chamber Choir.
Canticle – for singers, actors and large ensemble premiered at the Brisbane Cathedrals Festival.
Sprung! – performed by The Song Company.
Ein Psalm Davids – SATB choir and solo violin, performed by the Sydney Philharmonia Motet Choir and Rachael Beesley as part of the Immortal Bach series at the Eugene Goosens Hall, ABC Centre Ultimo.
A Strange Kind of Paradise with texts by Jordie Albiston performed by Sirens Ensemble recording released on Halcyon's Waves III

Orchestra and large ensemble
The Art of Resonance – tuba concerto, performed by Steve Ross and the Sydney Symphony Orchestra conducted by Marin Alsop.
On Eagles Wings – at the International Tuba Conference University of Minnesota
Iniquitous Symmetries – performed by Nouvel Ensemble Moderne directed by Lorraine Vaillancourt as part of UNESCO Forum93 in Montreal.
Maze for 15 musicians – performed by Ensemble Modern during the International Society of Contemporary Music World Music Days in Luxembourg.
The Art of Memory – performed by Marina Phillips and the Australian Brandenburg Orchestra at the City Recital Hall, Sydney.
L'arte di volare – performed by the Tasmanian Symphony Orchestra directed by Christian Wojtowicz
Corbaccio for orchestra and Corbaccio III for three concertante trombones and orchestra performed by the Adelaide Symphony Orchestra conducted by David Porcelijn.
On the Passing of Time for mixed concertante ensemble and orchestra performed by Simone de Haan, Chrsitian Wojtowicz and Daryll Pratt and the Tasmanian Symphony Orchestra conducted by David Porcelijn.

Opera, theatre and broadcast
Don Juan – with Greg White; performed by The Sydney Front at Performance Space, Sydney and released on CD featuring Annette Tesoriero.
Thirst – with Greg White at the Australian Museum for director Yaron Lifschitz and designer Genevieve Blanchett
Remedy – an opera in one act; libretto by Marguerite Bunce.
Voicejam and Video – at the Adelaide Festival
Musica Viva – performed by Tom O'Kelly (Percussion) in Japan.
Bach: a sonic exhibition – co-curated with Greg White, performed by the Seymour Group.
Heart of Fire; commissioned by ABC Sport as the theme for the 2000 Summer Paralympics; released as a CD single on ABC Classics.
The Flight of Les Darcy – an opera, premiered at the 10 Days on the Island festival, Hobart, Tasmania. Libretto by Robert Jarman.
Midnite – performed by the Australian Opera at Melbourne Festival.
Mrs Macquarie's Cello – a music theatre work for The Song Company directed by Roland Peelman and produced for broadcast by Anna Messariti.
Hekuba's Lament – voice and chamber ensemble commissioned by Much Ado Productions.
War is not the Season for Figs – voice, accordion and cello commissioned and broadcast on ABC Radio National on its Poetica program featuring the poetry of Linda Cvetkovic produced by Michael Bates.

Awards

 Music Fellowship awarded by the Music Board of the Australia Council (April 2003)
 Paul Lowin Song Cycle Prize (1999), First Prize for Canticle
 Paul Lowin Song Cycle Prize (1997), Highly Commended for FishTale

References

External links
 
 Profile, Australian Music Centre

Australian male composers
Australian composers
1964 births
Living people
Musicians from Sydney
Sydney Conservatorium of Music alumni
Place of birth missing (living people)